Farias is a Portuguese surname.

 Alexandre Farias de Lima Júnior (born 1989), Brazilian footballer
 Alisson Farias (born 1996), Brazilian footballer
 André Filipe Farias Marques (born 1987), Portuguese footballer
 André Oliveira Farias (born 1979), Brazilian footballer
 Anna Maria Farias, American lawyer and government official
 Augusto Farias, Brazilian politician, brother of Paulo Cesar Farias
 Bruna Farias (born 1992), Brazilian sprinter
 Bruno Candido Farias (born 1987), Brazilian footballer
 Carlos Farias (born 1976), Chilean-born soccer player
 Diego Farias (born 1990), Brazilian footballer
 Diogo da Silva Farias (born 1990), Brazilian footballer
 Ediglê Quaresma Farias (born 1978), Brazilian footballer
 Edson Rodrigues Farias (born 1992), Brazilian footballer
 Eleílson Farias de Moura (born 1985), Brazilian footballer
 Fernando Camilo Farias (born 1986), Brazilian footballer
 Jeff Farias, American talk-show host
 Leandro Farias (born 1983), Brazilian-born Togo footballer
 Lindbergh Farias (born 1969), Brazilian politician
 Lucas Farias (born 1994), Brazilian footballer
 Marlon Farias Castelo Branco (born 1985), Brazilian footballer
Paola Farías, Ecuadorian actress and former beauty pageant
 Paulo Cesar Farias (1945–1996), central figure in 1992 Brazilian corruption scandal
 Roberto Farias (born 1932), Brazilian film director
 Sérgio Farias (born 1967), Brazilian football manager
 Wanderson Cristaldo Farias (born 1988), Brazilian footballer
 Willian Farias (born 1989), Brazilian footballer
 Vanderlei Farias da Silva (born 1984), Brazilian footballer
 Zenon de Souza Farias (born 1954), Brazilian former football player

See also
 Farías
 Farias Brito
 Faria